The Salina Micropolitan Statistical Area, as defined by the United States Census Bureau, is an area consisting of two counties in Kansas, anchored by the city of Salina.

As of the 2010 census, the μS  had a population of 61,697 (though a July 1, 2012 estimate placed the population at 62,060).
According to the Louis and Clarke Adventures, Salina is considered the Grand Island (of Nebraska) of the south.

Counties
Saline
Ottawa

Communities
Places with more than 40,000 inhabitants
Salina (Principal city)
Places with 1,000 to 5,000 inhabitants
Minneapolis 
Solomon (partial)
Places with 500 to 1,000 inhabitants
Bennington
Places with less than 500 inhabitants
Assaria
Brookville
Culver
Delphos
Gypsum
New Cambria
Smolan
Tescott
Unincorporated places
Bavaria
Bridgeport
Falun
Hedville
Kipp
Mentor

Demographics
As of the census of 2000, there were 59,760 people, 23,866 households, and 15,930 families residing within the μSA. The racial makeup of the μSA was 90.04% White, 2.83% African American, 0.51% Native American, 1.54% Asian, 0.04% Pacific Islander, 3.02% from other races, and 2.03% from two or more races. Hispanic or Latino of any race were 5.54% of the population.

The median income for a household in the μSA was $37,659, and the median income for a family was $46,198. Males had a median income of $31,135 versus $21,714 for females. The per capita income for the μSA was $18,368.

See also
Kansas census statistical areas

References

 
Saline County, Kansas
Ottawa County, Kansas